Emilio Julio Abreu (10 June 1954 – 21 February 2022) was a Paraguayan swimmer. He competed in three events at the 1976 Summer Olympics. Abreu died on 21 February 2022, at the age of 67.

References

External links
 

1954 births
2022 deaths
Sportspeople from Asunción
Olympic swimmers of Paraguay
Paraguayan male swimmers
Swimmers at the 1976 Summer Olympics